Eternal September or the September that never ended is Usenet slang for a period beginning around 1993 when Internet service providers began offering Usenet access to many new users. The flood of new users overwhelmed the existing culture for online forums and the ability to enforce existing norms. AOL followed with their Usenet gateway service in March 1994, leading to a constant stream of new users. Hence, from the early Usenet point of view, the influx of new users in September 1993 never ended.

History 

During the 1980s and early 1990s, Usenet and the internet were generally the domain of dedicated computer professionals and hobbyists; new users joined slowly, in small numbers, and observed and learned the social conventions of online interaction without having much of an impact on the experienced users. The only exception to this was September of every year, when large numbers of first-year college students gained access to the internet and Usenet through their universities. These large groups of new users who had not yet learned online etiquette created a nuisance for the experienced users, who came to dread September every year. Once ISPs like AOL made internet access widely available for home users, a continuous influx of new users began, which continued through to 2015 according to Jason Koebler, making it feel like it is always "September" to the more experienced users.

The full phrase appears to have evolved over a series of months on two separate alt.folklore newsgroups where a number of threads exist lamenting what they saw as an increase in low-quality posts across various newsgroups. Several members of the newsgroups referenced aspects of the "September" issue, typically in a joking manner. 

In a thread on January 8, 1994, Joel Furr cross-posted asking "Is it just me, or has Delphi unleashed a staggering amount of weirdos on the net?", which garnered a reply from Karl Reinsch "Of course it's perpetually September for Delphi users, isn't it?" The day before, Furr had also posted the same message to alt.folklore.urban, where David Fischer responded with a joke call-to-action where he referred to the increasing numbers of Delphi users as the "Never-Ending-September". Fischer also replied to a different thread on January 25, 1994, in alt.folklore.computers saying, "It's moot now. September 1993 will go down in net history as the September that never ended." This quote has been suggested to have been the first reference.

Possibly the first use of the "Eternal September" phrase was a newsgroup post by John William Chambless in February 1994. He posted a rant including some excerpts of low-quality articles he found in one of his newsgroups that day, but titled the post "The Eternal September".

Legacy 
A tongue-in-cheek program called sdate outputs the current date, formatted using the Eternal September calendar (September X, 1993, where X is an unbounded counter for days since that epoch). This is not the identically named sdate, one of the sixty commands that comes with the First Edition of Unix, that is used to set the system clock.  Named with similar humour is one of the few remaining free public Usenet servers (besides Internet Service Providers & colleges providing those for users), Eternal-September.org.

See also 
 July effect

References

External links 

 
 sdate, a Unix program that outputs the date of Never Ending September

1993 in computing
History of the Internet
Internet slang
September
September 1993 events
Usenet
1990s neologisms
1990s in Internet culture
AOL